Colonus hesperus is a species of jumping spider in the family Salticidae. It is found in the United States and Mexico.

References

Further reading

External links

 

Salticidae
Spiders described in 2004